Stratford is the only town in Stratford District, and the seat of the Taranaki region, in New Zealand's North Island. It lies beneath the eastern slopes of Mount Taranaki, approximately halfway between New Plymouth and Hāwera, near the geographic centre of the Taranaki Region.

Road and rail 
Stratford is at the junction of State Highway 3 and State Highway 43.

This road is known as "The Forgotten World Highway", due to the scarcity of settlement along the road in contrast to its earlier history. A sign reads "No Petrol for ".

Stratford railway station is the junction of the Marton–New Plymouth and Stratford–Okahukura lines.

Population
Stratford is a rural service centre, serving the agricultural economy of its wider hinterland.

The population of the district peaked in 1961 at 11,300, and until the end of the century the town fluctuated between 5229 (2001) and 5664 (1996). The 21st century has seen significant economic growth and some associated population growth in the town.

Stratford had a population of 5,784 at the 2018 New Zealand census, an increase of 315 people (5.8%) since the 2013 census, and an increase of 447 people (8.4%) since the 2006 census. There were 2,322 households, comprising 2,811 males and 2,979 females, giving a sex ratio of 0.94 males per female, with 1,206 people (20.9%) aged under 15 years, 981 (17.0%) aged 15 to 29, 2,361 (40.8%) aged 30 to 64, and 1,230 (21.3%) aged 65 or older.

Ethnicities were 89.1% European/Pākehā, 17.1% Māori, 1.6% Pacific peoples, 3.5% Asian, and 1.1% other ethnicities. People may identify with more than one ethnicity.

The percentage of people born overseas was 10.2, compared with 27.1% nationally.

Although some people chose not to answer the census's question about religious affiliation, 48.9% had no religion, 38.6% were Christian, 0.6% had Māori religious beliefs, 0.6% were Hindu, 0.1% were Muslim, 0.4% were Buddhist and 1.6% had other religions.

Of those at least 15 years old, 387 (8.5%) people had a bachelor's or higher degree, and 1,395 (30.5%) people had no formal qualifications. 459 people (10.0%) earned over $70,000 compared to 17.2% nationally. The employment status of those at least 15 was that 1,980 (43.3%) people were employed full-time, 582 (12.7%) were part-time, and 201 (4.4%) were unemployed.

History and culture

Whakaahurangi
The Māori name for Stratford is Whakaahurangi, meaning to look to the sky. The name is taken from a story of the Ngati Ruanui chieftainess/Puhi Ariki named Rua-pū-tahanga who fled her husband Whatihua from Waikato, travelling the track known as Te ara tapu o Ruaputahanga which stretches from Urenui down through Tariki, and ends near Patea. Here she stopped at the side of the Kahouri river near a fresh water spring. Being a clear night, Rua-pū-tahanga lay contemplating the stars when slumber overtook her. Withdrawing in respect, her followers observed that their chieftainess slept "with her face to the sky". The site continued to be used as a camping place for Māori, the track she followed linking the south Taranaki tribes to those in north Taranaki, and further north to Kawhia. Each traveling party would recollect the story of Rua-pū-tahanga sleeping with her face to the sky. The name is fitting, given the exposure of the area to a broad horizon on the face of the mountain's ring plain.

Whakaahurangi Marae, a marae (meeting ground) of the Ngāti Ruanui tribe and its Ahitahi sub-tribe, is located in Stratford. It includes a wharenui (meeting house), known as Te Whetū o Marama.

Surveying
There is no record of Māori settlement in the vicinity of Stratford. Before British settlement the area was covered in dense forest and swamp. The Vogel schemes of the 1870s provided the necessary impetus to lead to the construction of a railway line south of New Plymouth, and the creation of road access at the same time, to open up access to the rich soils under the mountain.

In 1876, Taranaki Waste Lands Board assistant surveyor Edwin Stanley Brookes, Jnr. cut a meridian line from Waitara to the site of Stratford, and oversaw the subdivision of a block between the Manganui River and the Pātea River. The surveying of a new site for a town on the banks of the Pātea River was authorised on 11 June 1877, and the northern half of the town (above the Pātea River) was laid out by William Skinner in July. More lots were laid out by Peter Cheal in 1879, and in 1880 Skinner was directed to survey the southern half of the town.

Naming

On 3 December 1877, the name Stratford-upon-Patea was adopted, on the motion of William Crompton of the Taranaki Waste Lands Board. The supposed similarity of the Pātea River to the River Avon in England led to the adoption of this name, and Crompton was known to have a literary turn of mind. There was a trend at the time to name towns after the birthplace of prominent British men. The William Shakespeare 'connection' led to the naming of 67 streets after Shakespearian characters from 27 of his plays.

Today New Zealand's only glockenspiel clock tower plays the balcony scene from Romeo and Juliet three times a day.  The spoken words are provided via external loudspeakers - there is no carillon (multiple bells) as would be more typical for glockenspiels in towers.

Settlement and growth
Stratford was formally classified as a town in June 1878, and on 31 August 1878 an auction of 455 sections saw the first sections sold. By 1881 the population was 97, comprising 56 males and 41 females, with 22 houses. By 1891 this had grown to a population of 342 and by 1896 1,256. This growth continued steadily until the mid-late 20th century, and has since fluctuated between 5229 (2001) and 5664 (1996), numbering 5,337 at the last census.

Institutional history
The first Stratford Town Board was formed in 1882. The Stratford County Council was formed in 1890, and the Stratford Borough Council was formed on 22 July 1898. In the same year, Stratford became the third town in New Zealand to have electric street lighting, on the initiative of inventor and entrepreneur Alexander Walker Reid. The county and borough councils amalgamated on 1 April 1989 to form the Stratford District Council, which was reconstituted on 1 November 1989 as part of the nationwide restructure in local government.

Schools

There are two secondary schools in Stratford:
The school was founded in 1897 and celebrated its centenary in 1997.
The school was founded in 1914 and moved to its present site in 1917. Most of the students are boarders.

There are three primary schools within Stratford township:
The school was founded in 1882 and celebrated 125 years in 2007.

All these primary schools are coeducational and accept students for years 1–8. Rolls are as of

Parks and reserves
Stratford has a number of public parks and reserves, with names reflecting its English and Māori heritage;
 King Edward Park
 Victoria Park
 Windsor Park
 Kopuatama Cemetery

Born or lived in Stratford

Sportspeople

 Mark "Bull" Allen (31 July 1967), All Black, TV host
 Christine Arthur (26 August 1963), New Zealand field hockey player
 Arthur Collins (1906–1988), All Black
 John Graham (1 January 1935), All Black, NZRU president, NZ cricket team manager, Auckland University Chancellor, Auckland Grammar School headmaster, businessman
 Stan Lay (1906–2003) Olympic Javelin thrower (born in New Plymouth)
 Dave Loveridge (born 22 April 1952), former All Black
 John McCullough (8 January 1936), All Black
 Lane Penn, representative rugby footballer, coach, All Black selector and NZRU President
 Mark Robinson (born 17 January 1974), former All Black and current NZ Rugby CEO
 Ned Shewry (1889–1962), world champion woodchopper
 Alan Smith (10 December 1942), All Black
 Jeremiah Trueman (born 19 May 1987), New Zealand national basketball representative

Literature, art and culture
 Sylvia Ashton-Warner (1908–1984), novelist, autobiographer and educational pioneer
 Michael Hight (1961), artist - painter
 Michele Leggott (1956), poet and literary scholar
 Dominic Sheehan, author of Finding Home, a novel that illustrates growing up in Stratford
 Cheryll Sotheran (1945-2017), founder of the Museum of New Zealand Te Papa Tongarewa 
 Greg Whyte (1958), Author

Medicine
 Dr John Daniel Bergin (17 January 1921 – 22 July 1995), Distinguished physician and neurologist, Catholic pro-life apologist
 Dr Mel Brieseman, missionary to India, Canterbury Medical Officer of Health
 Dr Graham Gordon (10 December 1927 – 29 February 2004), Surgeon, St John's officer, NZMA Council Chairman (1977–1988) and NZMA President (1990–1991)

Law, government and politics
 David Thomson (1915–1999), Minister of Defence and Minister of Justice in the Third National Government of New Zealand
 Venn Young (1929–1993), Cabinet minister in the Muldoon National Government and homosexual rights activist

Academics
 Alice Copping (14 May 1906 – 21 August 1982), Senior lecturer in nutrition, Queen Elizabeth College, University of London
 Dr Alan Kirton (1933 - 2001), agricultural scientist
 Jack Tizard (1919-1979) Professor of Child Development, University of London. CBE

Other
 Brian Davis, (1934–1998), Archbishop of New Zealand
 Emily Stevens (3 September 1900 – 8 August 1967), wholesale florist, nurserywoman, iris hybridiser
  Paula Parore (November 1975) The Voice Australia 2012 & 2015 NZ National Anthem Singer All Blacks in Sydney, Brisbane and Perth

Notes

References
 The Stratford Inheritance by Ian Church, 1990, Heritage Press Ltd, Waikanae, New Zealand: 
 Stratford: Shakespearean Town Under the Mountain by David Walter, 2005, Dunmore Publishing, Wellington, New Zealand:

External links
 Venture Taranaki (tourism information)
 Stratford District Council
 Stratford in the Encyclopaedia of New Zealand

 
Populated places in Taranaki
Stratford District, New Zealand